Taenaris bioculatus  is a butterfly in the family Nymphalidae. It was described by Félix Édouard Guérin-Méneville in 1830. It is endemic to New Guinea in the Australasian realm

Subspecies
 T. b. bioculatus (Waigeu, Gebe, Salawati, Northwest New Guinea)
 T. b. albius  Brooks, 1950   (New Guinea: Afrak, Weyland, Kunupi)
 T. b. grisescens  Rothschild, 1915 (New Guinea: Snow Mountains)
 T. b. avarea  Fruhstorfer, 1916  (Southwest New Guinea)
 T. b. charondas  Fruhstorfer, 1911 (New Guinea: Lower Aroa River)
 T. b. charon  Staudinger, 1887 (New Guinea: Fischhafen) 
 T. b. cameronensis  Rothschild, 1916  (New Guinea: Owen Stanley Range)

References

External links
Taenaris at Markku Savela's Lepidoptera and Some Other Life Forms

Taenaris
Butterflies described in 1830
Endemic fauna of New Guinea